David Zinczenko (born December 13, 1969) is an American publisher, author and businessman. Previously, he was the executive vice president and general manager of Men's Health, Women's Health, Prevention and Rodale Books, the editorial director of Men's Fitness and the nutrition and wellness editor at ABC News.

Early life and education
Zinczenko grew up in Bethlehem, Pennsylvania, where he attended Liberty High School. He attended Moravian College in Bethlehem, where he was editor-in-chief of the Moravian College student newspaper, The Comenian. He later served in the U.S. Navy Reserves.

Career
In 2000, Zinczenko was named editor-in-chief of Men's Health by the magazine's publisher, Rodale, Inc. in Emmaus, Pennsylvania.

On December 14, 2010, Min credited Zinczenko for the "#1 Most Notable Launch of the Past 25 Years". Zinczenko oversaw the launches of both Women's Health and the affluent men's lifestyle publication Best Life, as editorial director of the two brands.

In 2009, Advertising Age Atiya deemed Women's Health the "Magazine of the Year". In 2011, he was named editorial director of both Organic Gardening and Prevention. He left Rodale at the end of 2012.

He was hired in 2013 by American Media's CEO David Pecker to re-launch Men's Fitness and to create brand extensions for the men’s lifestyle publication while also turning Shape into an active lifestyle publication and helping to oversee Muscle & Fitness.   

In 2013, Zinczenko was named the nutrition and wellness editor at ABC News. Later that year, Zinczenko launched Galvanized Media. Galvanized owns and operates Eat This, Not That!, Best Life and Zero Belly. Its imprint, Galvanized Books, distributed by Random House, produced The 7-Day Flat-Belly Tea Cleanse by Kelly Choi, and Simon & Schuster distributed The 14-Day No Sugar Diet. Galvanized's Branded Content arm is called Galvanized Strategies. 

Zinczenko returned to Men's Health in 2018, to become interim editorial director.

References

1969 births
American non-fiction writers
American television personalities
American publishers (people)
Businesspeople from Pennsylvania
Diet food advocates
Living people
Writers from Bethlehem, Pennsylvania
Men's Health (magazine)
Rodale, Inc.
Liberty High School (Bethlehem, Pennsylvania) alumni
Moravian University alumni
American magazine editors
Journalists from Pennsylvania
Organic gardeners
American people of Ukrainian descent